George Greene may refer to:

George Greene (traveller) (born 1747/8), traveller, land-steward and writer
George S. Greene (1801–1899), Union general during the Civil War
George Washington Greene (1811–1883), United States historian
George Woodward Greene (1831–1895), U.S Representative from New York
George Greene (judge) (1817–1880), former Iowa Supreme Court justice
George Greene (Australian politician) (1838–1911), New South Wales politician
George Greene, real name of former NFL player Tiger Greene

See also
George Green (disambiguation)